The Avro 548 was a civil trainer aircraft built in Britain after World War I. Its design was based extensively on Avro's 504 military aircraft, but it had an inline engine and a third seat. The prototype, designated 545, first flew with a Curtiss OX-5  V-8 engine, but this proved impractical for the civil market on account of the engine's weight and the complexity of its cooling system. An air-cooled Renault engine was used instead, and the designation 548 applied to this configuration. In practice, these aircraft were usually customised for their buyers and most differed from each other in equipment and detail; some were retrofitted war-surplus 504s. Many were used as civil trainers, others for joyriding, personal transport and racing.

A revised version, the 548A resulted when fitted with an ADC Airdisco engine, a development of the Renault which gave 120 hp (90 kW). This engine greatly improved performance.

Plans for a version with an enclosed cabin, designated 553 were never brought to fruition.

Operators

Latvian Air Force - Two 548Ns acquired 1924.

Portuguese Air Force - Two 548As acquired 1924.

Specifications (548)

References

Citations

Bibliography

External links

 Avro 548 – British Aircraft Directory

1910s British civil utility aircraft
548
Biplanes
Single-engined tractor aircraft
Aircraft first flown in 1919